Mpowele Swathe is a South African politician, a former Member of Parliament with the Democratic Alliance, and the former Shadow Minister of Rural Development and Land Reform.

In March 2014 it became known that Swathe had joined the United Christian Democratic Party, and his name appeared on both parties' lists for the 2014 general election. UCDP did not win any seats.

References 

Living people
Democratic Alliance (South Africa) politicians
Members of the National Assembly of South Africa
Year of birth missing (living people)